Li Ming (born 21 January 2000), is a Chinese footballer who plays as a forward for Guangzhou City.

Club career
Born in Qingdao, Shandong, Li started playing football as a child, joining his primary school football team at the age of ten, the same year he joined Qingdao Luyin. In 2011, his performances at the Mayor's Cup drew the attention of football fans throughout China, where he was described as "Maradonna-possessed" by a commentator, as well as earning the nickname "Qingdao little Messi", for his immense performances, scoring numerous goals and being noted for his dribbling ability. He was also recruited into the Qingdao team in the same year.

He once again garnered national attention the following year, this time for his performances at a primary school championship final, where he scored four goals and recorded one assist in a 5–2 victory.

In 2013, Li was selected for the Wanda Group's "China's Future Football Star" initiative, to encourage the development of young Chinese players. He joined the academy of Atlético Madrid, progressing through the youth ranks and representing the club at under-17 level. However, despite a promising start in Madrid, he was loaned to RSD Alcalá for the 2017–18 season, making eleven appearances for the under-19s.

He returned to China at the beginning of 2019, signing with Chinese Super League side Guangzhou City.

International career
At the age of thirteen, Geng received call-ups to both the under-14 and under-15 national teams. He was called up to the Chinese under-16 team in 2015.

Personal life
Li is of Korean ethnicity.

Career statistics

Club

Notes

References

2000 births
Living people
Footballers from Qingdao
Footballers from Shandong
Chinese people of Korean descent
Chinese footballers
China youth international footballers
Association football forwards
Association football midfielders
China League Two players
Qingdao F.C. players
Qingdao Hainiu F.C. (1990) players
Atlético Madrid footballers
RSD Alcalá players
Guangzhou City F.C. players
Chinese expatriate footballers
Chinese expatriate sportspeople in Spain
Expatriate footballers in Spain